Barwar may refer to:
Barwar, Lakhimpur Kheri, a town in Uttar Pradesh, India
Barwari or Barwar, a region in northern Iraq
 Barwar (caste)